Merionoedopsis is a genus of long-horned beetles in the family Cerambycidae. There are at least two described species in Merionoedopsis.

Species
These two species belong to the genus Merionoedopsis:
 Merionoedopsis aeneiventris Gounelle, 1911
 Merionoedopsis brevipennis Melzer, 1935

References

Further reading

 

Cerambycidae
Articles created by Qbugbot